Rouge on Pockmarked Cheeks is the third album by Brazzaville. The album which was produced by Nigel Godrich was released in 2002.

Track listing

"Motel Room" – 4:56
"Samurai" – 6:25
"Queenie" – 4:28
"1980" – 4:50
"Rainy Night" – 3:12
"Genoa" – 6:29
"Trona" – 4:30
"Xanax and Three Hours of TV" – 3:17
"High Life" – 3:26
"N. Koreatown" – 6:20
"Late Night Lullaby" – 14:34

References 

Brazzaville (American band) albums
1998 albums
Albums produced by Tony Hoffer
Albums produced by Nigel Godrich